Ancient Mesopotamia at the Dawn of Civilization: the Evolution of an Urban Landscape is an ancient history monograph by Guillermo Algaze, published in 2008 by University of Chicago Press.

See also
A History of Babylonia and Assyria by Robert William Rogers.

References

External links

University Press Scholarship Online
C.C. Lamberg-Karlovsky (2008) "A Brutal Social Landscape: Mesopotamian Civilization as Exclusive and Exploitative?" The Review of Archaeology. Vol. 29. pages 1-12. 

American non-fiction books
2008 non-fiction books
Books about the ancient Near East
History of Western Asia